French cloister is situated in the northern Bahamas, on Paradise Island.  It is from a 14th-century Augustinian monastery, dismantled and imported from Europe by William Randolph Hearst.  Purchased while still in pieces from Hearst's estate by Huntington Hartford and reassembled stone by stone here as the centerpiece of the Versailles Gardens on Paradise Island.  Overlooks Nassau Harbor to one side, and the One & Only Ocean Club resort to the other.

Religious buildings and structures in the Bahamas